Hardy is a village in Nuckolls County, Nebraska, United States. The population was 159 at the 2010 census.

History
Hardy was platted in 1880 when the railroad was extended to that point. It was named for a railroad official.

Geography
Hardy is located at  (40.009417, -97.926397).

Demographics

2010 census
As of the census of 2010, there were 159 people, 69 households, and 44 families living in the village. The racial makeup of the village was 100.0% White. Hispanic or Latino of any race were 0.6% of the population.

There were 69 households, of which 24.6% had children under the age of 18 living with them, 47.8% were married couples living together, 7.2% had a female householder with no husband present, 8.7% had a male householder with no wife present, and 36.2% were non-families. 33.3% of all households were made up of individuals, and 8.6% had someone living alone who was 65 years of age or older. The average household size was 2.30 and the average family size was 2.86.

The median age in the village was 43.1 years. 25.2% of residents were under the age of 18; 7.5% were between the ages of 18 and 24; 21.4% were from 25 to 44; 29.4% were from 45 to 64; and 16.4% were 65 years of age or older. The gender makeup of the village was 52.2% male and 47.8% female.

2000 census
As of the census of 2000, there were 179 people, 68 households, and 46 families living in the village. The population density was 293.6 people per square mile (113.3/km2). There were 89 housing units at an average density of 146.0 per square mile (56.3/km2). The racial makeup of the village was 100.00% White.

There were 68 households, out of which 32.4% had children under the age of 18 living with them, 55.9% were married couples living together, 5.9% had a female householder with no husband present, and 30.9% were non-families. 26.5% of all households were made up of individuals, and 16.2% had someone living alone who was 65 years of age or older. The average household size was 2.63 and the average family size was 3.17.

In the village, the population was spread out, with 32.4% under the age of 18, 8.4% from 18 to 24, 19.6% from 25 to 44, 26.3% from 45 to 64, and 13.4% who were 65 years of age or older. The median age was 36 years. For every 100 females, there were 126.6 males. For every 100 females age 18 and over, there were 112.3 males.

As of 2000 the median income for a household in the village was $28,750, and the median income for a family was $31,250.  Males had a median income of $16,250 versus $15,500 for females. The per capita income for the village was $13,539. About 17.0% of families and 18.4% of the population were below the poverty line, including 26.8% of those under the age of eighteen and 17.2% of those 65 or over.

References

Villages in Nuckolls County, Nebraska
Villages in Nebraska